Yanornithiformes is an order of ornithuromorph birds from the early Cretaceous Period of China. All known specimens come from the Yixian Formation and Jiufotang Formation, dating to the early Aptian age, 124.6 to 120 million years ago.

The family Songlingornithidae was first named by Hou in 1997 to contain the type genus, Songlingornis. Clarke et al. (2006) was first to find a close relationship between Songlingornis and the "yanornithids", which had been previously named to contain the similar species Yanornis and Yixianornis.  At least one study has found the late Cretaceous Mongolian bird Hollanda to be a member of this group. The family Yanornithidae (now Songlingornithidae) had been placed in its own order containing no other families, named Yanornithiformes, in 2001.

Beginning in 2012, several studies began to find that the hongshanornithids, smaller, more specialized birds from the same time and place as some of the songlingornithids, were more closely related to songlingornithids than to other early birds, making them part of the same clade, while some studies continued to find them just outside the yanonrithiform clade.

References 

Prehistoric euornitheans
Early Cretaceous birds of Asia
Aptian first appearances
Early Cretaceous extinctions